Die Versuchung ("The Temptation") is an album by German singer Jasmin Wagner, released on 15 April 2006.

Track listing
"Männer brauchen Liebe" (Men Need Love)
"Ein zerbrechlicher Moment" (A Fragile Moment)
"Ein schlechtes Gewissen" (A Bad Conscience)
"Wahrscheinlich Hallo" (Probably Hello)
"Komm schon werd' wütend" (Come On, Get Furious)
"Versuchung" (Temptation)
"Ich bereue dich so gerne" (I Regret You So Happily)
"Ein neues Gefühl" (A New Feeling)
"Morgen, wenn ich weg bin" (Tomorrow, When I'm Gone)
"Entschuldigen Sie" (Pardon Me)
"Alles, was du willst" (Everything You Want)

External links
 Official website of Jasmin Wagner

2006 albums
German-language albums